The second Rugby League World Cup was held in Australia in 1957. As before a group stage was held first, with matches being held at locations in Sydney and Brisbane.

The 1957 World Cup marked the 50th anniversary of rugby league in Australia but the hosts were not confident of their ability to lift the trophy, having capitulated in the Ashes series in England barely seven months previously. Great Britain, under Alan Prescott, and boasting world-class backs such as Billy Boston, Mick Sullivan, Jeff Stevenson and Lewis Jones, and a formidable pack, were expected to win with Jacques Merquey's French side a dark horse.

In the end Australia were dominant, winning all matches and were declared the champions by virtue of finishing top of the group – there was no World Cup Final. Best and fairest awards were made to individual nations, the recipients being Gilbert Benausse (France), Brian Carlson (Australia), Phil Jackson (Great Britain) and Bill Sorensen (New Zealand).

Squads

Referees 
Referee Vic Belsham from New Zealand controlled three matches at the World Cup, including controlling one of New Zealand's matches. New Zealand included his brother Sel at halfback.

Venues

Results

Try scorers 
3

  Ian Moir
  Kel O'Shea
  Mick Sullivan

2

  Brian Carlson
  Ken McCaffery
  Harry Wells
  Jean Foussat
  Phil Jackson
  Tom Hadfield

1

  Brian Clay
  Bill Marsh
  Dick Poole
  Norm Provan
  Gilbert Benausse
  Jacques Merquey
  Billy Boston
  Jack Grundy
  Lewis Jones
  Sid Little
  Jeffrey Stevenson
  Cliff Johnson
  Bill McLennan
  George Menzies
  Jim Riddell
  Bill Sorensen
  George Turner

References

External links 
 1957 World Cup at rlhalloffame.org.uk
 1957 World Cup at rlwc2008.com
 1957 World Cup at rugbyleagueproject.com
 1957 World Cup data at hunterlink.net.au
 1957 World Cup at 188-rugby-league.co.uk